The Boeing E-6 Mercury (formerly Hermes) is an airborne command post and communications relay based on the Boeing 707-300. The original E-6A manufactured by Boeing's defense division entered service with the United States Navy in July 1989, replacing the EC-130Q. This platform, now modified to the E-6B standard, conveys instructions from the National Command Authority to fleet ballistic missile submarines (see communication with submarines), a mission known as TACAMO ("Take Charge And Move Out"). The E-6B model deployed in October 1998 also has the ability to remotely control Minuteman ICBMs using the Airborne Launch Control System. The E-6B replaced Air Force EC-135Cs in the Looking Glass role, providing command and control of U.S. nuclear forces should ground-based control become inoperable. With production lasting until 1991, the E-6 was the final new derivative of the Boeing 707 to be built.

Design and development

Like the E-3 Sentry Airborne Warning and Control System (AWACS) aircraft, the E-6 is adapted from Boeing's 707-320 airliner.

The E-6A, which was initially named Hermes, entered service with squadron VQ-3 on 3 August 1989. A second squadron, VQ-4, received its first E-6As in January 1991, allowing the EC-130Q to be phased out in June that year. The E-6A was renamed Mercury in autumn 1991 by request of the Navy. Sixteen E-6A planes were delivered from 1988 to 1992.

The E-6B is an upgrade of the E-6A. It includes a battlestaff area and updated mission equipment.  The flight deck systems were later replaced with an off-the-shelf 737 Next Generation cockpit. This greatly increases the situational awareness of the pilot and saves significant cost over the previous custom avionics package. The first E-6B was accepted in December 1997. All 16 E-6A aircraft were modified to the E-6B standard, with the final delivery taking place on 1 December 2006.

The E-6 cannot use the probe-and-drogue in-flight refueling method that most other US Navy aircraft use, instead featuring a flying boom receptacle on the upper-forward fuselage, making it, like the USN's Boeing P-8 Poseidon aircraft, reliant on specific U.S. Air Force aircraft (KC-135 Stratotanker, KC-10 Extender, and KC-46 Pegasus) for in-flight refueling.

Operational history
Codenamed Looking Glass, it is United States Strategic Command's (USSTRATCOM) Airborne Command Post (ABNCP), designed to take over in case the Global Operations Center (GOC), located at Offutt Air Force Base, Nebraska, is destroyed or incapable of communicating with strategic forces. The term "Looking Glass" is used because the ABNCP "mirrors" the abilities of the US Strategic Command GOC to control nuclear forces.

The E-6 fleet is based at Tinker Air Force Base, Oklahoma, and operated by Fleet Air Reconnaissance Squadron 3 (VQ-3), VQ-4, and VQ-7.

In 2021, one of the E-3D Sentry aircraft that had been in service with the Royal Air Force was purchased for conversion into a dedicated E-6 trainer. This was done as a means of extending the life of the operational fleet by reducing the need for it to be used for training missions.

Specifications (E-6B)

See also

References

Bibliography

 Francillon, René J. (1995). "Messenger of the Gods: The Boeing E-6 Mercury in USN Service." Air International, Vol. 48, No 1, January 1995, pp. 19–24.
 Breffort, Dominique (2008). Boeing 707, KC-135 and Civilian and Military Versions. Paris: Histoire & Collections, 2008. , pp. 93–94

External links

 E-6B Mercury Fact File page
 USSTRATCOM ABNCP Fact Sheet
 E-6 Mercury (TACAMO) page at FAS.org
 E-6 Mercury page on tech.military.com

E-06 Mercury
E-06 Mercury, Boeing
Quadjets
United States nuclear command and control
Boeing 707
Aircraft first flown in 1987